Omar Azmy Shama (born 1976) (Various spellings include Omar Schama, Omar Chama) is an Egyptian screenwriter and film producer born in Cairo, Egypt.  Following university, he worked as a reporter at the Associated Press news agency. He later quit his job to focus on a career in the film industry.

In 2012, he founded with independent filmmaker Ahmad Abdalla and actor Asser Yassin the production company Independent Filmmakers Initiative: Mashroua. His new film After the Battle (film) with filmmaker Yousry Nasrallah has been selected to compete for the Palme d'Or at the 2012 Cannes Film Festival.

References

External links
Mashroua Official site

Egyptian screenwriters
1976 births
Living people